Joseph Andrew Green (January 14, 1881 – October 27, 1963) was a United States Army officer with the rank of major general, who is most noted as a Chief of the Coast Artillery Corps during the years 1940-1942.

Biography
Green was born on January 14, 1881, in Cherokee, Iowa. He graduated from the United States Military Academy at West Point in 1906. During World War I, Green served with the American Expeditionary Forces in France.

After the War, Green served at the War Department General Staff until 1931 and subsequently was appointed Commanding Officer of the 61st Coast Artillery Regiment. In 1937, Green was appointed as Executive Officer to the Chief of Coast Artillery and served in this capacity until 1940, when he succeeded Archibald H. Sunderland as the Chief of Coast Artillery.

In 1942, position of Chief of Coast Artillery was abolished and Green was appointed Commanding General of Anti-Aircraft Artillery Command. He held this command until his retirement in 1946.

Major General Joseph Andrew Green died on October 27, 1963, and is buried at Fort Sam Houston National Cemetery.

Decorations
Major General Joseph A. Green received these awards during the span of his military career:

See also
 U.S. Army Coast Artillery Corps
 Seacoast defense in the United States
 Harbor Defenses of Manila and Subic Bays

References

External links

 The Hammer of Hell (about Anti-aircraft Artillery in WW II)
 

1881 births
1963 deaths
People from Cherokee, Iowa
United States Military Academy alumni
United States Army Coast Artillery Corps personnel
United States Army Command and General Staff College alumni
United States Army War College alumni
Recipients of the Distinguished Service Medal (US Army)
Recipients of the Legion of Merit
United States Army generals of World War II
United States Army generals
United States Army personnel of World War I
Burials at Fort Sam Houston National Cemetery
Military personnel from Iowa